Phyllonorycter dubiosella is a moth of the family Gracillariidae. It is known from Austria and Bosnia and Herzegovina.

References

dubiosella
Moths of Europe
Moths described in 1877